The Spy with a Cold Nose is a 1966 British comedy film directed by Daniel Petrie and starring Laurence Harvey, Daliah Lavi, Lionel Jeffries, Denholm Elliott, and Colin Blakely. The film was nominated for Golden Globe Awards in the Best English-Language Foreign Film and Lionel Jeffries in the Best Performance in a Comedy or Musical category.

The plot is a spy spoof in which a dog has a covert listening device implanted beneath the skin before the dog is presented as a gift to the Russian leader. The spies recruit a veterinarian, played by Laurence Harvey, to retrieve the transmitter before the Russians find it. Daliah Lavi plays the sexy Princess Natasha Romanova.

Cast
 Laurence Harvey as Dr. Francis Trevelyan 
 Daliah Lavi as Princess Natasha Romanova 
 Lionel Jeffries as Stanley Farquhar 
 Eric Sykes as Wrigley 
 Eric Portman as British Ambassador 
 Denholm Elliott as Pond-Jones 
 Colin Blakely as Russian Premier 
 June Whitfield as Elsie Farquhar 
 Robert Flemyng as Chief M.I.5 
 Bernard Archard as Russian Intelligence Officer
 Robin Bailey as man with Aston Martin 
 Genevieve as Nightclub Hostess 
 Nai Bonet as Belly Dancer 
 Paul Ford as American General 
 Michael Trubshawe as Braithwaite 
 Bruce Carstairs as Butler
 Glen Mason as 'Ark' Assistant 
 Norma Foster as 'Ark' Nurse
 Gillian Lewis as Lady Warburton 
 Wanda Ventham as Mrs. Winters 
 Amy Dalby as Miss Marchbanks 
 Tricia De Dulin as Air Hostess 
 Virginia Lyon as Lift Attendant 
 Julian Orchard as Policeman 
 John Forbes-Robertson as M.I.5 Workshop Director 
 Arnold Diamond as Agent in Water Wagon
Pickles the dog as himself

References

External links
 
 

 

1966 films
1960s parody films
British parody films
1960s spy comedy films
Films directed by Daniel Petrie
Films scored by Riz Ortolani
Films about dogs
1966 comedy films
Parody films based on James Bond films
1960s English-language films